Michael Joe Budnick (September 15, 1919 – December 2, 1999) was an American professional baseball player, a right-handed pitcher who appeared in 42 games, eight as a starter, in the Major Leagues from – for the New York Giants. The native of Astoria, Oregon, grew up in Seattle, Washington, where he attended Queen Anne High School.

Budnick's professional career lasted for nine seasons (1939–1942; 1946–1950), interrupted by service in the United States Navy in the Pacific Theater of Operations during World War II.

He spent the entire 1946 campaign on the Giants' roster, compiling a 2–3 record and a creditable 3.16 earned run average in 35 games.  On August 4, 1946, he started against the Pittsburgh Pirates at the Polo Grounds and hurled his only MLB complete game and shutout, winning 6–0.

Altogether, Budnick allowed 91 hits and 58 bases on balls in 100 MLB innings pitched, with 42 strikeouts.

References

External links

1919 births
1999 deaths
Baseball players from Oregon
Baseball players from Seattle
Major League Baseball pitchers
New York Giants (NL) players
San Diego Padres (minor league) players
San Francisco Seals (baseball) players
Seattle Rainiers players
Spokane Indians players
Tri-City Braves players
Twin Falls Cowboys players
United States Navy personnel of World War II
Yakima Bears players